Rayl (later Hackstaff) is a former town in Lassen County, California. It was named after David Rayl, who built a hotel/store at the site in 1915.

In 1917, Rayl tried to persuade the senators from California to establish a training base at the site, and while the proposal was supported by the surrounding states, it was not accepted. At about the same time, the NCO sold the right-of-way south of the junction to the Western Pacific, which took up the track and relaid it to standard gauge.

In the fall of 1920, Rayl leased his business to one Cyrus Helman, who also became assistant postmaster. This relationship led to strife in 1922 when Rayl found accounting discrepancies with the postal receipts; he also had sold the goods in the store to Helman, but had received only half of the payment due. A lawsuit ensued, whose outcome is unclear: in the end it was dismissed by the court in 1930 because a trial date had never been set. In the meantime, the post office was renamed to Hackstaff in 1922, but it closed the same year. This was also the year when the NCO ended service between Rayl and Wendel and the Western Pacific moved its crews to Doyle.

Rayl held on to the property until 1942, when it he sold it for $1,000 for the construction of the Sierra Army Depot.

References

Former settlements in Lassen County, California
Former populated places in California